The PowerPC e700 or NG-64 (Next Generation 64-bit) were the codenames of Freescale's first 64-bit embedded RISC-processor cores.

In 2004 Freescale announced a new high performance core. Not much was known about it. It would be a multi core, multithreaded design using CoreNet technology, shared with the e500mc core. It would be a three issue core with double precision FPU. Roadmaps showed a target frequency of 3+ GHz, manufactured on a 32 nm process and that the chips would be named on a MPC87xx scheme.

Freescale released a core with similar specifications in June 2010 called the e5500.

See also
 PowerPC e5500
 PowerPC e500
 Motorola G5 project (Motorola's defunct 64-bit PowerPC project)

External links
 Multi-Core Design: Key Challenges and Opportunities – Power.org
 Freescale Semiconductor reveals PowerPC core roadmap and scalable system-on-chip platforms – Motorola.com
 Freescale to detail dual-core PowerPC G4 – The Register.com
 MPC5121e: Automotive-Qualified Multi-Core Microprocessor for Telematics and Beyond - Power.org
 Power Architecture™ Technology Primer - Freescale.com

References

E700
E700